Disney XD was a Southeast Asian pay television channel owned by The Walt Disney Company (Southeast Asia) Pte. Ltd. and part of the Disney Branded Television unit of the United States-based Walt Disney Television, it was also operated by Fox Networks Group Asia Pacific during the acquisition on both Disney and Fox in 2019. It was aimed primarily at children, 6–15 years old.

Its programming lineup included Marvel and Star Wars shows, reruns of programs previously aired on Disney Channel and certain action series. It also aired some pre-school related programs from Disney Junior.

History
Disney XD first began broadcasting in Malaysia on 15 September 2012. The channel was expanded to Singapore on 16 March 2013, Indonesia and Thailand on 19 October 2013, and lastly, the Philippines on 31 May 2014.

After the ban of Disney Channel India and Disney XD India in Bangladesh due to broadcasting in Hindi language and heavy localisation of the Indian feeds, Disney XD Asia was made available on few digital cable platforms there in 2016.

Due to Astro's Refreshed Kids Pack on 14 December 2020 and the launch of Disney+ Hotstar on 1 June 2021, the channel, along with Disney Junior, ceased broadcasting on Astro and Astro-owned TV providers (including NJOI and Kristal-Astro). Therefore, there's the only impact that The Walt Disney Company will be shutting down Disney XD in Southeast Asia on the same date and time by following the review of Disney's business in the region, just before Astro have already confirmed with this statement before Astro shutting down both Disney Channel and Disney Junior on the same date and time. However, The Walt Disney Company didn't announce that Astro will be shutting down Disney Channel and Disney Junior on New Year's Day 2021 at midnight.

On 28 February 2019, the Malaysian feed of Disney XD Asia was merged into the main feed, with timings on promos now saying MAL/PHIL instead of SIN/PHIL. Astro, the sole operator in Malaysia that formerly carried Disney Channels made Disney XD an HD only channel from 1 March 2019 and the SD version on Disney XD (617) ceased broadcasting from the Astro list on 14 March 2019.

Disney XD was not distributed to Hong Kong and Vietnam, and therefore selected programs from Disney XD was available on Disney Channel Asia.

Disney Channel, Disney XD and Disney Junior ceased transmission in Singapore on June 1, 2020 on both Singtel and StarHub. Selected programs from these 3 channels were moved to Disney+ on 23 February 2021.

Due to a review of Disney's business in the region and after more than 8 years of broadcasting, Disney XD ceased operations at 1:10am on 1 January 2021. Disney XD's content were moved to Disney Channel (which already ceased transmission in Malaysia and Singapore but continued to broadcast in other Southeast Asian countries until its shutdown on 1 October 2021), Disney+ Hotstar (in Indonesia, Malaysia, and Thailand) and Disney+ (in Singapore and the Philippines). The last programme to air on the channel was an episode of Counterfeit Cat, it then shows an episode of The Tiniest Man in the World, which then shows a lot of Blam! clips and then it cuts to a black screen after that.

In the Philippines, it showed a Test Card at 2:15 am. The channel space was replaced by Metro Channel on January 4, 2021 on Cignal.

In Malaysia, it showed a Grey Message at 12:05 am. The channel space was replaced by TA-DAA! (now DreamWorks Channel) on March 15, 2021 on Astro.

Final programming 
This is a list of television programmes on Disney XD in Southeast Asia.

Former programming

Original animated series
The 7D (27 July 2020 – 31 December 2020)
Big Hero 6: The Series (13 May 2018, 25 July 2020,- Baymax Returns) 
Billy Dilley's Super-Duper Subterranean Summer (until closure)
DuckTales (21 January 2018)
Future-Worm (November 2015-25 December 2019)
Gravity Falls (October 2012; June 2017-June 2019)
Kick Buttowski: Suburban Daredevil (2012-2017; 10 May 2020; 6 July 2020 - 31 December 2020)
Legend of the Three Caballeros (until closure)
Lego Star Wars: All-Stars (until closure)
Lego Star Wars: The Freemaker Adventures (until closure)
Milo Murphy's Law (11 January 2020 – 31 December 2020)
Motorcity (until closure)
Penn Zero: Part-Time Hero (2018 – 31 December 2020)
Phineas and Ferb (2013-2018; 29 February 2020; 1–22 June 2020)
Pickle & Peanut (until closure)
Randy Cunningham: 9th Grade Ninja (until closure)
Right Now Kapow (until closure)
Star Wars Rebels (4 October 2014 – 2018)
Star Wars Resistance (12 October 2018 – 1 March 2020; 5 June 2020 – closure)
Tron: Uprising (until closure)
Wander Over Yonder (1 January 2018 – closure)

Original live-action series
Club Mickey Mouse Malaysia (15 September 2017; January 2018 – closure) (also on Disney Channel)
Crash & Bernstein (until closure)
Fort Boyard: Ultimate Challenge (until closure)
Gamer's Guide to Pretty Much Everything (24 March 2016 – 31 October 2019; 3 July 2020 – closure)
Kickin' It (until closure)
Kirby Buckets (16 May 2015 – 25 December 2019; 7 July 2020 – closure) 
Lab Rats (2013-December 25, 2019)
Lab Rats: Elite Force (201?-October 31, 2019; July 2, 2020 – closure)
Mech-X4 (2017-June 28, 2019; July 8, 2020 - closure)
Mighty Med (until closure)
O11CE (2018 – closure)
Pair of Kings (until closure)
Parker Plays (June 6-July 27, 2020; season 2 only)
Player Select (June 6, 2020 – closure)
Wizards of Warna Walk (August 30-September 6, 2019; March 14, 2020 – closure)
Walk the Prank (August 10, 2016 – June 26, 2019; July 6, 2020 - closure)

Disney Channel UK original series 
101 Dalmatian Street (7 September 2020 – 31 December 2020)

Repeats of Disney Channel series
Sydney to the Max (June 2019) (the show continues on Disney Channel from July 5, 2019 – present)
The Suite Life on Deck (until closure)

Marvel programming
Hulk and the Agents of S.M.A.S.H. (until closure)
Marvel's Avengers Assemble (November 24, 2013 – closure)
Marvel Future Avengers (until closure)
Marvel Disk Wars: The Avengers (until closure)
Marvel's Spider-Man (October 14, 2017 – December 31, 2020) (also on Disney Channel)
Guardians of the Galaxy (until closure)
Ultimate Spider-Man (September 15, 2012 – September 1, 2020)

Disney Junior series
Jake and the Never Land Pirates (until closure)
Mickey Mouse Mixed-Up Adventures (January 25–26, 2020) (The show continues on Disney Junior)
Mira, Royal Detective (July 18, 2020; preview only)
Miles from Tomorrowland (until closure)
T.O.T.S. (September 28, 2019) (the show continues on Disney Junior)

Jetix Programming
Super Robot Monkey Team Hyperforce Go! (until September 1, 2020)
Yin Yang Yo! (until September 1, 2020)
Pucca (February 14, 2020)

Short series
Gravity Falls Shorts (until closure)
Mickey Go Local (until closure)
Mickey Mouse Shorts (airs occasionally)
Star Wars Rollout (until closure)
Two More Eggs (until closure)

Acquired programming
Atomic Puppet (until closure)
Beyblade Burst (January 1, 2019 – December 31, 2020)
Beyblade Burst Evolution (until closure)
Beyblade Burst Turbo (May 2019 – December 31, 2020)
Beyblade Burst Rise (May 23, 2020 – December 31, 2020)
Bobobo-bo Bo-bobo (until closure)
Boyster (until closure)
Chuck Chicken (until December 31, 2020)
Cross Fight B-Daman (until closure)
Cross Fight B-Daman ES (until closure)
Counterfeit Cat (until closure)
Danger Mouse (until closure)
Digimon Fusion Battles (until closure)
Fangbone! (until closure)
Freaktown (2016–18; May 8-July 3, 2020; September 2, 2020 – December 31, 2020)
Gigant Big Shot Tsukasa (May 25, 2017 – 2019)
Heroman (until closure)
Inuyasha (until closure)
Inuyasha: The Final Act (until closure)
Iron Man: Armored Adventures (until closure)
Japanizi: Going, Going, Gong! (June 16, 2014-Mid 2014)
Johnny Test (until closure)
Kaitou Joker (2016-2020) (now rerunning on Disney Channel)
Kid vs. Kat (until closure)
Kiko (May 25, 2020 – December 31, 2020)
Line Town (until closure)
Mega Man: Fully Charged (until closure)
Mr Bean (animated TV series) (November 2015 – 2016) (now on Boomerang and Cartoon Network)
Nerds and Monsters (until closure)
Ninja Warrior (until closure)
Numb Chucks (until closure)
Oscar's Oasis (until closure)
Pac-Man and the Ghostly Adventures (December 3, 2013 – 2015)
Packages from Planet X (December 23, 2013 – 2015)
Pirate Express (2015-October 1, 2019)
Pokémon: Black & White (June 4, 2016 – 2017)
Redakai: Conquer the Kairu (until closure)
Rekkit Rabbit (until closure)
Rimba Racer (until closure)
Rob the Robot
Rocket Monkeys (June 1, 2015 – October 1, 2019)
Rolling with the Ronks! (2018-2019; May 4, 2020 - closure)
Ryukendo (until closure)
Scaredy Squirrel (until closure)
Sidekick (until closure)
Slugterra (2013-May 3, 2020)
Supa Strikas (until closure)
Tayo the Little Bus (until closure)
Takashi's Castle (until closure)
Tenkai Knights (until closure)
Upin & Ipin (until closure)
Zak Storm (2018 – December 31, 2020)
Zig and Sharko (until closure)
Zip Zip (until closure)

External links 

 Disney XD Asia Schedule (now closed)

References 

Southeast Asia
Children's television channels in the Asia Pacific
Defunct television channels
English-language television stations
Television channels and stations established in 2012
Television channels and stations disestablished in 2020
Mass media in Southeast Asia
2012 establishments in Malaysia
2020 disestablishments in Singapore
2013 establishments in Singapore
Television stations in Malaysia
Television stations in Singapore
Television stations in Indonesia
Television stations in Thailand
Television stations in the Philippines
Television channel articles with incorrect naming style
Television channels in Bangladesh